Volunia was a web search engine (or social search engine) created by Massimo Marchiori. It was launched in beta only for registered power users on February 6, 2012 and went live on June 14, 2012. Volunia, dubbed as "the search engine of the future", was speculated to be based on Hyper Search technology. On June 8, 2012, Marchiori announced with an open letter  that he had been excluded from his project: six days later, on June 14, 2012, the site went live, but it ceased to operate in February 2014.

History

The name Volunia stems from the words “volo” (flight) and “luna” (moon), because – as Marchiori says – he wanted to evoke the quantum leap his social search engine was trying to deliver. The Volunia project has been entirely developed in Italy: the head office is located in Padua, the servers are located in Sardinia and hosted by Tiscali, and the whole team, formed by 14 people, is Italian.

The project
Volunia differs from normal search engines in that, while it crawls the web and indexes websites, it builds the ranking using the comments and opinions of other users.
The Volunia service allows people to interact with each other in every page they visit, as well as with the web sites' owners. Volunia uses a system similar to Sidewiki. Volunia also introduces for the first time a "fly-over" map visualization for every web site, where every web site is turned into a city metaphor, also representing social information.
According to Marchiori, Volunia is not a competitor to the existing search engines, staying on an alternative level. Despite what Marchiori said, some people in the internet community consider Volunia a challenge and a potential competitor for Google.

References

Internet search engines